Brigadier Charles Bannatyne Findlay   (1883–1965) was a senior British Army officer who served in the First World War and then the Second World War. He briefly commanded the 2nd Infantry Division.

Military career
Findlay was commissioned into the Royal Artillery on 23 June 1903 and was awarded the Military Cross in the 1917 New Year Honours for his service during the First World War. He became Commander, Royal Artillery (CRA) for 2nd Infantry Division on 17 January 1936 and served in that capacity during the Second World War, which began in September 1939.

Following the Dunkirk evacuation in May 1940, the 2nd Division was placed on Home Defence duties in Yorkshire. Findlay was appointed a Commander of the Order of the British Empire in the 1940 Birthday Honours and briefly served as acting General Officer Commanding the 2nd Division from 12 to 15 August 1940.

References

External links
Generals of World War II

1883 births
1965 deaths
Royal Artillery officers
Commanders of the Order of the British Empire
Recipients of the Military Cross
British Army personnel of World War I
British Army brigadiers of World War II